Richard Ray Whitman (born 1949) is a Yuchi-Muscogee multidisciplinary visual artist, poet, and actor. He is enrolled in the Muscogee Nation and lives in Oklahoma.

Early life and education
Whitman was born in Claremore, Oklahoma, in 1949.<ref name=vision>Vigil, Jennifer C. "Richard Ray Whitman." Museum of Contemporary Native Arts: Vision Project." (retrieved 10 May 2011)</ref> His maternal grandmother was Polly Long. Like many Yuchis, Whitman is enrolled in the Muscogee Nation, and his Yuchi name is T'so-ya-ha. He grew up in Gypsy, Oklahoma, and attended Bristow High School. He also attended the Institute of American Indian Arts, the California Institute of the Arts, and the Oklahoma School of Photography in Oklahoma City.

 Career 
Whitman began his art career as a painter and expanded to photography, installation, and video art. In 1973, he participated in the 71-day occupation of Wounded Knee and created art during the occupation.

 Photography 
Whitman is known for his black-and-white photography portraying contemporary Native realities, especially his "Street Chiefs Series" from the 1970s and 1980s. "Street Chiefs" features images of homeless Native men, primarily in downtown Oklahoma City. "The contemporary Indian in the isolation of the city canyons and rural reservations is avoided. The boredom, pain, frustration, poverty of the reality-counterbalance of our lives is harsh, unattractive, and unmarketable." His photographic portraits are compassionate and empathetic to the lives of homeless natives and places them in the larger context of Indian Removal, which forced tribes from all over the country to Indian Territory.

From the 1980s onward, Whitman has incorporated text and computer graphics in his photography to create collage or mixed media. His socio-politically informed work often deals with the issues of homeland and dispossession.

 Videography and acting career 
Collaborating with Yuchi poet and brother Joe Dale Tate Nevaquaya, Whitman created video to document the Yuchi language. Together they worked with French filmmaker Pierre Lobstein in the 1990s. Whitman read T.C. Cannon's poetry in the video "Mazerunner: The Life and Art of T.C. Cannon" which was directed and edited by Phillip Albert. This work was subsequently screened at the Metropolitan Museum of Art (3/19/1994) and was presented on the Bravo Cable Channel and the Independent Film Channel from May, 1995 through June, 1996.

Filmography

 Film 

 Television 

See also
List of Native American artists
Visual arts by indigenous peoples of the Americas

References

Further reading
 Lester, Patrick D. The Biographical Directory of Native American Painters. Norman: Oklahoma University Press, 1995. .
 Lippard, Lucy. Mixed Blessings: New Art in a Multicultural America''. New York: The New Press, 2000. .

External links
 Profile and contact info through the Oklahoma Arts Council
 Interview with Richard Ray Whitman by Larry Abbott
 Native Networks biography, National Museum of the American Indian
Oral History Interview with Richard Whitman at the Oklahoma Native Artists Oral History Project

People from Claremore, Oklahoma
Yuchi
1949 births
Living people
Members of the American Indian Movement
Muscogee (Creek) Nation people
Native American painters
Native American installation artists
Native American filmmakers
Native American male actors
Painters from Oklahoma
Native American photographers
American contemporary painters
20th-century Native Americans
21st-century Native Americans